Lindsey Hilsum (born 3 August 1958) is an English television journalist and writer. She is the International Editor for Channel 4 News, and a regular contributor to The Sunday Times, The Observer, The Guardian, New Statesman, and Granta.

Biography

Early life
Her father is professor Cyril Hilsum, a physicist best known for research that helped form the basis of modern LCD technology. She attended Worcester Grammar School for Girls and the University of Exeter, where she graduated with a degree in French and Spanish.

Career
Lindsey Hilsum is Channel 4 Newss International Editor. She has covered the major conflicts including the wars in Iraq, Afghanistan and Kosovo and the Israeli-Palestinian conflict. In  2011, she reported the uprisings in Egypt and Bahrain, as well as Libya. She has also reported extensively from Iran and Zimbabwe, and was Channel 4 News China Correspondent from 2006 to 2008. During the 2004 US assault on Falluja, she was embedded with a frontline marine unit, and in 1994, she was the only English-speaking foreign correspondent in Rwanda when the genocide began. Before becoming a journalist, she was an aid worker, first in Latin America and then in Africa.

Her first book, Sandstorm: Libya in the Time of Revolution, was published by Faber in the UK in April 2012, and by Penguin Press in the US in May 2012, and was shortlisted for the Guardian First Book Award (2012). Her second book, In Extremis: The Life and Death of the War Correspondent Marie Colvin, was published by Farrar, Straus and Giroux in the US in November 2018, and by Chatto & Windus in the UK in January 2019. This book was shortlisted for the 2019 Costa book prize in the biography category.

Views 
In an interview with The Oxford Student in 2010, Hilsum remarked that "American news media “shows almost no images of death, of killing, of injury – the result was that people thought it was a blood-free war, and that affects how people feel about what their government does”. In contrast, the Arab news media broadcasts much more graphic images of the reality of war. When deciding what is acceptable to broadcast from conflict zones, she argues that the crucial question is whether “you are using those images as propaganda, or whether you are using them to try and tell people the truth about war”. She concedes that this “is a very difficult thing to get right”, but is emphatic that it is not the place of a foreign correspondent to manipulate emotive images “to make a political point”.

Awards
Hilsum was awarded an honorary doctorate by the University of Essex in 2004 and has won several awards including the Royal Television Society Journalist of the Year, James Cameron Award, One World Broadcasting Trust award, Amnesty, Voice of the Listener & Viewer and the Charles Wheeler Award. In 2017, she was awarded the Patron's Medal of the Royal Geographical Society She won the 2018 James Tait Black Memorial Prize (Biography) for In Extremis.

References

External links
 C4 Biography
 archived C4 biography
 Column at Channel4.com

1958 births
Living people
ITN newsreaders and journalists
Alumni of the University of Exeter
British television executives
Women television executives
British journalists
Channel 4 people
Writers from Worcester, England
People from Malvern, Worcestershire
Recipients of the Royal Geographical Society Patron's Medal